Collin Quaner (born 18 June 1991) is a German former professional footballer who played as a forward.

Early life
Quaner grew up in Düsseldorf-Gerresheim, where his parents still live. He is of Ghanaian ancestry. His father is Ghanaian while his mother is German.

Career

Arminia Bielefeld
In June 2010 Quaner joined 2. Bundesliga club Arminia Bielefeld from Fortuna Düsseldorf where he had played for Fortuna Düsseldorf II and the club's under-19 youth team. He signed a two-year contract with Arminia Bielefeld.

In September 2010 Quaner was invited to a training course of the Germany U20 national team by coach Frank Wormuth. He also appeared in a match against the Switzerland U20, scoring the second goal in a 3–0 win.

Union Berlin
In July 2015, after VfR Aalen were relegated to the 3. Liga, Quaner moved on a free transfer to 2. Bundesliga side Union Berlin signing a two-year contract until 2017.

Huddersfield Town
On 20 January 2017, Quaner completed a move to EFL Championship club Huddersfield Town for an undisclosed fee, signing a three-and-a-half year contract. He scored his first goal for the club on his debut against Rochdale in the FA Cup on 28 January 2017, and he helped the club win promotion to the Premier League in May 2017 via the play-offs with Quaner creating Nahki Wells' equaliser in the semi-final second-leg at Sheffield Wednesday just one minute after his introduction as a substitute. The Terriers went on to win both the semi-final and final, in which Quaner also came off the bench, on penalties.
He was released by Huddersfield in July 2020.

Ipswich Town (loan)
On 8 January 2019, Quaner was loaned to Ipswich Town.

St Mirren
Six months after being released by Huddersfield, Quaner signed with Scottish Premiership side St Mirren on 8 January 2021, on a deal short-term deal until the end of the 2020–21 season.

Austria Klagenfurt and retirement
In November 2021 Quaner trained with Austria Klagenfurt before signing a contract until summer 2023. In December he agreed the termination of his contract and ended his playing career citing persistent knee and achilles problems.

Career statistics

Honours
Huddersfield Town
EFL Championship play-offs: 2017

References

External links

1991 births
Living people
Footballers from Düsseldorf
German footballers
Association football forwards
Germany youth international footballers
2. Bundesliga players
3. Liga players
Regionalliga players
Premier League players
English Football League players
Scottish Professional Football League players
Fortuna Düsseldorf players
Fortuna Düsseldorf II players
Arminia Bielefeld players
FC Ingolstadt 04 players
FC Ingolstadt 04 II players
FC Hansa Rostock players
VfR Aalen players
1. FC Union Berlin players
Huddersfield Town A.F.C. players
Ipswich Town F.C. players
St Mirren F.C. players
SK Austria Klagenfurt players
German expatriate footballers
German expatriate sportspeople in England
Expatriate footballers in England
German expatriate sportspeople in Scotland
Expatriate footballers in Scotland
German expatriate sportspeople in Austria
Expatriate footballers in Austria
German sportspeople of Ghanaian descent